"Cheers 2 U" is a song by American R&B group Playa recorded for their debut studio album of the same name (1998). The song was released as the album's second single in March 1998.

Track listing
CD
"Cheers 2 U" (LP Version)
"Cheers 2 U" (Instrumental)

Personnel
Information taken from Discogs.
mixing – Jimmy Douglas, Timbaland
production – Timbaland
writing – Stephen "Static" Garrett, Tim Mosley

Chart performance

Notes

External links

1998 singles
Playa (band) songs
Song recordings produced by Timbaland
Songs written by Static Major
Songs written by Timbaland
1998 songs